Beta-D-galactosyl-(1->4)-L-rhamnose phosphorylase (D-galactosyl-beta1->4-L-rhamnose phosphorylase, GalRhaP) is an enzyme with systematic name beta-D-galactosyl-(1->4)-L-rhamnose:phosphate 1-alpha-D-galactosyltransferase. This enzyme catalyses the following chemical reaction

 beta-D-galactosyl-(1->4)-L-rhamnose + phosphate  L-rhamnose  + alpha-D-galactose 1-phosphate

The enzyme from Clostridium phytofermentans is also active towards beta-D-galactosyl derivatives of L-mannose, L-lyxose, D-glucose, 2-deoxy-D-glucose, and D-galactose.

References

External links 
 

EC 2.4.1